Lava Fork is a creek in northwestern British Columbia, Canada and of the Alaska Panhandle, United States. It lies west of the Unuk River and northwest of Stewart. It flows south from the Lava Lakes across the British Columbia-Alaska border into the Blue River in the extreme northern part of Misty Fjords National Monument.

See also
Iskut volcanic field
Northern Cordilleran Volcanic Province
List of volcanoes in Canada
List of Northern Cordilleran volcanoes
Volcanism of Canada
Volcanism of Western Canada
Lava Forks Provincial Park
Misty Fjords National Monument

References

Rivers of the Boundary Ranges
Rivers of Ketchikan Gateway Borough, Alaska
Stikine Country
Northern Cordilleran Volcanic Province
Rivers of Alaska
International rivers of North America